The Qalandar are a Muslim ethnic group, found in North India and Pakistan. They are also known as Qalander Faqir. A few Qalandar are also found in the Terai region of Nepal.

History and origin

The Qalandar in India trace their origin back to the devotees of the Sufi saint Bu Ali Shah Qalandar, who is buried in Panipat, in what is now Haryana. These devotees left their homes in the cities of  Karnal and Panipat for some unknown reason and settled in territory that now forms part of the modern state of Uttar Pradesh. Initially, these devotees belonged to the Sufi order of the  Qalandariyah Faqirs, who then took to the profession of bear fighting. The Qalandar consists of three sub-divisions, the Langre in eastern Rohilkhand, the Rohilla in western Rohilkhand and the Machhle in Awadh, all of whom are found in Uttar Pradesh, and speak their own dialect, known as Qalandari.

In Pakistan, the Qalandar are found mainly in Pakistani Punjab. According to their traditions, the Qalandar are descended of ancestors that arrived in from Balkh and Bukhara in Central Asia in the distant past. These settlers were all said to be devotees of the Sufi saint Bu Ali Qalandar of Panipat. Unlike the Uttar Pradesh Qalandar who moved east, the Qalandar of what became Pakistan began a slow migration westward, with small groups moving into Punjab by mid 15th Century. At the time of the partition of India in 1947, the Muslim Qalandar of east Punjab, which included Panipat and Karnal moved to Pakistan, joining groups who were already settled there.

Present circumstances

In India

In North India, a part of these people started leading bears, monkeys and other performing animals with which they wander, announcing the presence with an hour glass shaped drum called a damru, which is used in their performances for emphasis, while a larger part of these people settled in Uttar Pradesh, Bihar, and Bengal and began a sedentary life while continuing the old traditional mystic religious beliefs. Some of them got connected to different khanqah in Bihar especially in Biharsharif and Danapoor. Historically, all Qalandar were once a nomadic community, but many are now settled. In 1972, bear hunting and capturing were declared illegal in India, and there has been persistent effort by the Indian government to clamp down on the activity of bear performing. In addition, the traditional occupation of bear fighting has come to much criticism from the animal rights activists in the west, and have now been proscribed by India. They are now undergoing settlement, with many taking to cultivation. But their holdings are extremely small, and many are sharecroppers. A much larger group of Qalandars are now daily wage labourers, and they are extremely marginalized community, both socially and economically.

Although the community are Sunni, they incorporate many folk traditions and beliefs. This includes special reverence to the Sufi saint Bu Ali Qalandar, who is buried in Panipat. They visit his shrine every year on occasion of his birth. Many of the settled Qalandar are undergoing Islamization, and some of their folk beliefs are being discarded. But they remain an extremely marganilized community, interacting little with neighbouring Muslim communities.

In Pakistan

The basic unit of the Qalandar society is the tent or puki. Each puki represents a commensal group, comprising a female, her spouse and unmarried . A collection of puki forms a dera or camp. Most members of the dera are related to each other. Marriages take place with close kin, and the Qalandar practice both cross cousin and parallel cousin marriages.

Unlike their Indian counterparts, the Pakistan Qalandar are still nomadic, with most still involved in their traditional occupations of entertainment routines involving trained bears, monkeys, dogs and goats. In addition, they are often skilled jugglers, acrobats, magicians, impersonators and beggars. The Qalandar travel from community to community, setting camp in fallow fields. In Pakistan the bears are trapped is by members of the Kohistani ethnic group, and then sold to the Qalandar in markets in Peshawar and Rawalpindi. The Qalandar are an extremely marganilized group, suffering from discrimination and often victims of abuse by state officials such as the police or municipal staff.

See also
 Jogi
 Mirshikar

References

Dalit Muslim
Dom in India
Dom in Pakistan
Social groups of Uttar Pradesh
Social groups of Pakistan
Punjabi tribes
Indian castes
Muslim communities of India
Muslim communities of Nepal
Muslim communities of Uttar Pradesh
Dom people
Romani in India
Romani in Pakistan